Thank You for the Music is a box set by the Swedish pop group ABBA, released on 31 October 1994. It consists of 66 tracks across four discs, with the first three discs including all of the band's singles from 1972 - 1982, many B-sides, and some album tracks in chronological order; while the fourth disc includes some rarities and some previously unreleased material, most notably the 23-and-a-half minute long medley "ABBA Undeleted" which includes the track Just a Notion, released as part of Voyage in 2021. This box set marks the appearance of several ABBA tracks on compact disc for the first time.

In 2008 the Thank You for the Music box set was reissued in downsized packaging with a revised booklet.

History 
Plans for an ABBA box set had been floating around PolyGram's management since 1989, when they bought Stig Anderson's Polar Music group of companies and ABBA's entire catalogue along with them. In 1992, the box set project ended up being shelved in favour of a simple hits compilation. This idea became Gold: Greatest Hits, which became an unexpected success, launching ABBA back into the mainstream for the first time since the group split apart 10 years earlier. Gold was followed up by More ABBA Gold: More ABBA Hits in 1993 which marked the first look into ABBA's archive of unreleased tracks. Two completed tracks from ABBA's 1982 recording sessions - "Just Like That" and "I Am the City" - were brought out for inclusion on the disc, however, just "I Am the City" ended up being chosen. More ABBA Gold was also something of an unexpected success, and thus the box set idea was back on the table.

In late 1993, historian Carl Magnus Palm; ABBA members Björn Ulvaeus and Benny Andersson; and ABBA recording engineer Michael B. Tretow delved into ABBA's archives once again for some more unreleased tracks to include in the box set that would become Thank You for the Music. From the archives, just three songs would be released in full: an early take of the song "Thank You for the Music", from 1977 (sometimes called the "Doris Day" version); "Dream World", from 1979; and lastly "Put On Your White Sombrero", from 1980. No less than 15 other tracks that were rejected for inclusion in full were instead edited down into snippets and mixed together to create a medley titled "ABBA Undeleted", which also includes various sections of studio chatter from various recording sessions. One of the tracks, "Just a Notion", would later be re-recorded in full in ABBA's 2021 album Voyage.

Track listing 
All songs written and composed by Benny Andersson & Björn Ulvaeus, except where noted.

Disc 1 
Track release information taken from ABBA: The Complete Studio Recordings timeline booklet

 Tracks 1 – 5 originally credited to Björn & Benny, Agnetha & Anni-Frid

Disc 2

Disc 3

Disc 4

Personnel 
ABBA
Benny Andersson – synthesizer, keyboards, vocals
Agnetha Fältskog – vocals
Anni-Frid Lyngstad – vocals
Björn Ulvaeus – acoustic guitar, guitar, vocals

Additional personnel
Ulf Andersson – saxophone
Ola Brunkert – drums
Lars Carlsson – horn
Christer Eklund – saxophone
Malando Gassama – percussion
Anders Glenmark – guitar
Rutger Gunnarsson – bass
Roger Palm – drums
Janne Schaffer – guitar
Åke Sundqvist – percussion
Mike Watson – bass
Lasse Wellander – guitar

Production 
Producers: Benny Andersson, Björn Ulvaeus
Arrangers: Benny Andersson, Björn Ulvaeus
Engineer: Michael B. Tretow
Design: Icon, London
Liner Notes: Carl Magnus Palm

References 

ABBA compilation albums
1994 compilation albums
Albums recorded at Polar Studios
Albums produced by Björn Ulvaeus
Albums produced by Benny Andersson